Lars Barfoed (born 4 July 1957) is a Danish politician representing the Conservative People's Party and was the party's leader from 2011 to 7 August 2014. He was Justice Minister of Denmark from February 2010 to October 2011, and Deputy Prime Minister of Denmark from January to October 2011. He also served as Minister for Family and Consumer Affairs from 18 February 2005 to 14 December 2006.

A report from Rigsrevisionen had criticized the food quality inspections which is his ministry's responsibility, as well as the information which Barfoed had passed on to Folketinget about the problems. The Danish People's Party announced that it no longer had confidence in him on 13 December, meaning that there was a risk that a majority in the Folketing no longer supporting Barfoed. Barfoed resigned his office the same day with effect from 14 December. Later on it was concluded from the report that the situation only had become better while Barfoed was in office, and that the problems was dating back to former Minister of Food, Agriculture and Fisheries Ritt Bjerregaard. He was Minister for Transportation from September 2008 to February 2010.

On 14 January 2011, Lars Barfoed succeeded Lene Espersen as political leader of the Conservative People's Party. Ended on 8 August 2014. He was succeeded by Søren Pape Poulsen.

References 

In-line:

General:
 

1957 births
Living people
Danish Lutherans
Government ministers of Denmark
Members of the Folketing 2001–2005
Members of the Folketing 2005–2007
Members of the Folketing 2007–2011
Members of the Folketing 2011–2015
Ministers for children, young people and families
Conservative People's Party (Denmark) politicians
Danish Justice Ministers
People from Frederiksberg
Leaders of the Conservative People's Party (Denmark)
Transport ministers of Denmark